South Valley University (SVU) is a university in Egypt that provides teaching and research facilities.

The President of South Valley University is Prof. Dr. Youssuf Gherbawy.

South Valley University is one of Egypt's more modern higher education institutions. It has 16 faculties split between its two campuses in Qena and Hurghada. Initially a branch of Assiut University, SVU was established in 1995.

It has a second campus in the coastal city of Hurghada, just south of where the Gulf of Suez meets the Red Sea. Hurghada is home to the Faculty of Education.

SVU has placed strongly among similar universities in the country in national rankings. Tuition fees are low for domestic and international students alike. More than a quarter of its students are postgraduates.

Other faculties include Arts, Law, Science, Special Education, Medicine, Veterinary Medicine, Nursing, Engineering, Commerce, Agriculture and Physical Education.

SVU previously owned a campus in the city of Sohag further upstream, but this became a separate institution, Sohag University, in 2006. SVU’s Faculties of Education, Engineering, Arts, Science and Social Work had a presence here.

Postgraduate Studies

The Postgraduate Studies and Research Sector is one of the three components of the University’s technical affairs (Education & Students, Postgraduate Studies and Research, Community Service and Environmental Development). The sector is concerned with all fields related to postgraduate studies (Diploma – Masters – Doctorate – Fellowship), also the scientific research and whatever related to it, such as output, topics, journals, academic promotions, training and motivation for researchers, devices and laboratories. As well as the sector includes university libraries, whether central or those in colleges, university hospitals and museums, borrowing systems, etc.

Community services and environmental affairs

community service and the environmental development. The sector supervises on the centers and the units of special nature and also the university establishments that present the services for the community and the surrounding environment. In addition to that the sector organize symposiums and conferences, that aid to raise the level of the environmental culture, in addition to that the service convoys (medical, veterinary, awareness campaign…)for the direct interaction with the surrounding community.

References

http://www.svu.edu.eg/en/

Universities in Egypt
Educational institutions established in 1958
1958 establishments in Egypt
Educational institutions established in 1995
1995 establishments in Egypt